Fusolatirus brinkae is a species of sea snail, a marine gastropod mollusc in the family Fasciolariidae, the spindle snails, the tulip snails and their allies.

Description

Distribution
This marine species occurs off Durban, South Africa.

References

 Marais J.P. & R.N. Kilburn (2010) Fasciolariidae. pp. 106–137, in: Marais A.P. & Seccombe A.D. (eds), Identification guide to the seashells of South Africa. Volume 1. Groenkloof: Centre for Molluscan Studies. 376 pp.

Fasciolariidae
Gastropods described in 1996